Jan Adolf Brandeis (9 June 1818, Týniště nad Orlicí – 13 November 1872, Prague) was a Czech portrait painter and photographer.

Life and work 
He initially trained as a porcelain painter, then studied at the Academy of Fine Arts in Prague with František Tkadlík. He continued his studies in Munich with the portrait painter, then went to Paris in 1852, where he worked in the studios of Thomas Couture. Upon returning to Prague, he set himself up as a painter of portraits  and miniatures.
 
Around 1860, he began to experiment with daguerrotypes. He specialized in pastel-colored portraits. After only three years, he closed the studio and sold his equipment at auction. He died in 1872, and was buried at Olšany Cemetery.

He was mostly known for his watercolor portrait miniatures, and numbered several noble families among his regular customers. As a photographer, he eschewed the use of artificial, painted backgrounds. His work in that field received praise from the magazine, Lumír. In his later years, he often painted portraits from photographs, rather than from life.

References

Further reading 
 Naděžda Blažíčková-Horová, 19th-Century Art in Bohemia (1790-1910), Painting, Sculpture, decorative arts, National Gallery in Prague, 2009,

External links 

 Works about Brandeis @ the  Databáze Národní knihovny 
 Entry on Brandeis @ AbART
 Brief biography @ Pavel Scheufler, Fotohistorie

1818 births
1872 deaths
Czech painters
Czech portrait painters
Czech photographers
People from Rychnov nad Kněžnou District
Burials at Olšany Cemetery